Wilhelm Klaus Norbert Schmelzer (22 March 1921 – 14 November 2008) was a Dutch politician, diplomat and economist who served as Leader of the Catholic People's Party (KVP) from 1963 to 1971 and Minister of Foreign Affairs from 1971 to 1973.

Early career
Schmelzer attended the gymnasium of the Jesuit Sint Aloysius College in The Hague from June 1933 until July 1939 and applied at the Tilburg Catholic Economic University in July 1939 majoring in Economics. On 10 May 1940 Nazi Germany invaded the Netherlands and the government fled to London to escape the German occupation. During the German occupation Schmelzer continued his study obtaining an Bachelor of Economics degree in June 1941 before graduating with an Master of Economics degree in September 1945. Schmelzer worked as a civil servant for the Ministry of Economic Affairs from February 1947 until October 1956 for the department for Financial and Economic Policy from February 1947 until August 1951 and the department for European and International Policy from August 1951 until October 1956.

Political career

After the election of 1956 Schmelzer was appointed as State Secretary for the Interior in the Cabinet Drees III, taking office on 29 October 1956. The Cabinet Drees III fell on 11 December 1958 continued to serve in a demissionary capacity until the cabinet formation of 1958 when it was replaced by the caretaker Cabinet Beel II with Schmelzer continuing as State Secretary for the Interior, taking office on 22 December 1958. Schmelzer was elected as a member of the House of Representatives at the election of 1959, taking office on 20 March. Following the cabinet formation of 1959, Schmelzer was appointed as State Secretary for General Affairs in the Cabinet De Quay, taking office on 19 May 1959. The office of State Secretary for General Affairs was created specially for Schmelzer and was considered as a de facto Deputy Prime Minister. After the election of 1963 Schmelzer returned as a member of the House of Representatives, taking office on 2 July 1963. Following the cabinet formation of 1963 Schmelzer per his own request asked not to be considered for a cabinet post in the new cabinet. He was seen as a rising star by the Catholic People's Party's leadership and was considered as the favourite son to succeed Wim de Kort as the next Leader of the Catholic People's Party. The Cabinet De Quay was replaced by the Cabinet Marijnen on 24 July 1963 he continued serving in the House of Representatives as a frontbencher.

In November 1963 the Leader of the Catholic People's Party and parliamentary leader in the House of Representatives Wim de Kort announced he was stepping down as leader and parliamentary leader in the House of Representatives. The party leadership approached Schmelzer to be his successor, who accepted and became the leader and parliamentary leader, taking office on 7 December 1963. On 27 February 1965 the Cabinet Marijnen fell and continued to serve in a demissionary capacity and Schmelzer was appointed as formateur. Following a failed cabinet formation attempt he approached former Minister of Education, Arts and Sciences Jo Cals as a candidate for Prime Minister, Cals accepted and was appointed as formateur to form a new cabinet. The following cabinet formation of 1965 resulted in a coalition agreement between the Catholic People's Party, the Labour Party (PvdA) and the Anti-Revolutionary Party (ARP) which formed the Cabinet Cals on 14 April 1965.

On 14 October 1966 Schmelzer proposed a motion in the House of Representatives that called for a stronger financial and economic policy to further reduce the deficit from the Cabinet Cals, Prime Minister Cals saw this as an indirect motion of no confidence from his own party against his cabinet and announced the resignation of the cabinet that same day, the crisis would eponymous be called the Nacht van Schmelzer ("Night of Schmelzer"). The Cabinet Cals continued to serve in a demissionary capacity until the cabinet formation of 1966 when it was replaced by the caretaker Cabinet Zijlstra on 22 November 1966.

For the election of 1967 Schmelzer served as lijsttrekker (top candidate). The Catholic People's Party suffered a small loss, losing 8 seats but retained its place as the largest party and now had 42 seats in the House of Representatives. The following cabinet formation of 1967 resulted in a coalition agreement between the Catholic People's Party, the People's Party for Freedom and Democracy (VVD), the Anti-Revolutionary Party and the Christian Historical Union (CHU) which formed the Cabinet De Jong on 5 April 1967. In February 1971 Schmelzer unexpectedly announced that he was stepping down as party leader and that he would not stand for the general election of 1971 but wanted to run for the Senate. Schmelzer was elected as a member of Senate after the Senate election of 1971, he resigned as a member of the House of Representatives the same day he was installed as a member of Senate, taking office on 11 May 1971. Following the cabinet formation of 1971 Schmelzer was appointed as Minister of Foreign Affairs in the Cabinet Biesheuvel I, taking office on 6 July 1971. The Cabinet Biesheuvel I fell just one year later on 19 July 1972 and continued to serve in a demissionary capacity until it was replaced by the caretaker Cabinet Biesheuvel II with Schmelzer continuing as Minister of Foreign Affairs, taking office on 9 August 1972. In September 1972 Schmelzer announced his retirement from national politics and that he would not stand for the election of 1972. The Cabinet Biesheuvel II was replaced by the Cabinet Den Uyl following the cabinet formation of 1973 on 11 May 1973.

Late career
Schmelzer retired after spending 16 years in national politics and became active in the private sector and public sector; he occupied numerous seats as a corporate director and nonprofit director on several boards of directors and supervisory boards (Douwe Egberts, Akzo, Heijmans, Netherlands Atlantic Association and the Institute of International Relations Clingendael) and served on several state commissions and councils on behalf of the government (KPN, Public Pension Funds PFZW and the Cadastre Agency), as well as served as an diplomat and lobbyist for several economic delegations on behalf of the government and the European Economic Community. Schmelzer was also a prolific composer, pianist and poet having written more than a dozen compositions and poems from 1973.

Schmelzer, who joined the newly-formed Christian Democratic Appeal (CDA) in 1980, was known for his abilities as a debater and negotiator. He continued to comment on political affairs until his death at the age of 87. He holds the distinction as the first State Secretary for the Interior and the first and only State Secretary for General Affairs.

Decorations

References

External links

Official
  Drs. W.K.N. (Norbert) Schmelzer Parlement & Politiek
  Drs. W.K.N. Schmelzer Eerste Kamer der Staten-Generaal

 
 

 

 

 

 

1921 births
2008 deaths
Businesspeople from Rotterdam
Catholic People's Party politicians
Christian Democratic Appeal politicians
Commanders of the Order of the Netherlands Lion
Dutch classical composers
Dutch classical pianists
Dutch corporate directors
Dutch critics
Dutch diarists
Dutch expatriates in Germany
Dutch-language poets
Dutch lobbyists
Dutch keyboardists
Dutch male poets
Dutch male short story writers
Dutch short story writers
Dutch memoirists
Dutch nonprofit directors
Dutch officials of the European Union
Dutch people of German descent
Dutch political commentators
Dutch political writers
Dutch Roman Catholics
European Union lobbyists
Grand Cross of the Ordre national du Mérite
Grand Crosses of the Order of Merit (Portugal)
Grand Crosses of the Order of the Crown (Belgium)
Knights Commander of the Order of Merit of the Federal Republic of Germany
Grand Officiers of the Légion d'honneur
Honorary Knights Grand Cross of the Order of St Michael and St George
Knights of the Holy Sepulchre
Knights Grand Cross of the Order of Isabella the Catholic
Knights Grand Cross of the Order of Orange-Nassau
Leaders of the Catholic People's Party
Members of the House of Representatives (Netherlands)
Members of the Senate (Netherlands)
Ministers of Foreign Affairs of the Netherlands
Musicians from Rotterdam
Diplomats from Rotterdam
People from Sankt Ingbert
People from Wassenaar
Recipients of the Resistance Memorial Cross
State Secretaries for the Interior of the Netherlands
Tilburg University alumni
Writers from Rotterdam
20th-century Dutch civil servants
20th-century Dutch diplomats
20th-century Dutch economists
20th-century Dutch male writers
20th-century Dutch musicians
20th-century Dutch poets
20th-century Dutch politicians
21st-century Dutch male writers
21st-century Dutch musicians
21st-century Dutch poets
20th-century memoirists
20th-century diarists